Sir Wiwa Korowi  (born 7 July 1948) is a Papua New Guinean politician who served as the sixth governor-general of Papua New Guinea from November 1991 until November 1997.

Sir Wiwa is from the Southern Highlands. He was a member of the Nationalist Party and was voted by the Parliament to the position of governor-general on 18 November 1991, to fill the position after Vincent Eri had vacated roughly one and a half months earlier.

References 
 Lentz, Harris M., III. Heads of States and Governments. Jefferson, NC: McFarland & Company, 1994. .

1948 births
Living people
Governors-General of Papua New Guinea
Knights Grand Cross of the Order of St Michael and St George
People from the Southern Highlands Province